Grimestad is a village and statistical area (grunnkrets) in Tjøme municipality, Norway.

The statistical area Grimestad, which also can include the peripheral parts of the village as well as the surrounding countryside, has a population of 280.

The village Grimestad is located north of the villages Tjøme and Hulebakk. It is considered a part of the urban settlement Tjøme, which covers the central part of the island and has a population of 2,325.

References

Villages in Vestfold og Telemark